Cystacanthus is a genus of plant in the family Acanthaceae, found in south-east Asia.

Species 
The following species are listed on The Plant List: five of them are included in the Catalogue of Life (marked §):
Cystacanthus abbreviatus
Cystacanthus affinis §
Cystacanthus colaniae (Benoist) Y.F. Deng
Cystacanthus datii §
Cystacanthus harmandii
Cystacanthus lanceolatus
Cystacanthus paniculatus §
Cystacanthus punctatus
Cystacanthus pyramidalis
Cystacanthus vitellinus (Roxb.) Y.F. Deng
Cystacanthus yangtsekiangensis §
Cystacanthus yunnanensis W.W. Sm. §

Now included in Phlogacanthus: Cystacanthus cymosus, C. insignis, C. pulcherrimus and C. turgida.

References

External links
 
 

Flora of Indo-China
Flora of China
Acanthaceae genera
Acanthaceae